Tetulia B. M. C. College is a private higher secondary school in Tetulia, Naogaon Sadar Upazila, Bangladesh.

Colleges in Naogaon District
Educational institutions established in 2000
2000 establishments in Bangladesh